RB1-inducible coiled-coil protein 1 is a protein that in humans is encoded by the RB1CC1 gene.

Interactions 

RB1CC1 has been shown to interact with PTK2B, ASK1 and PTK2.

References

Further reading